Phoebe Eclair-Powell (born 1990) is a British playwright from South-East London. Her plays include WINK (Theatre503) and One Under (Pleasance Below). As an actress, she appeared in Peckham: The Soap Opera at the Royal Court. Her play Fury was a finalist for the Verity Bargate Award at Soho Theatre In the summer of 2016, Eclair Powell had three new shows running: Fury, at Soho Theatre, Torch at Underbelly and Epic Love and Pop Songs at Pleasance, both at the Edinburgh Fringe. In 2019, Eclair Powell won the Bruntwood Prize for Playwriting for her play Shed: Exploded View.

Eclair-Powell's mother is comedian Jenny Eclair.

Plays 
"TORCH"
"Epic Love and Pop Songs"
"Fury"
WINK
One Under 
 Mrs Spine
Bangin' Wolves
"These Bridges"

References 

1990 births
Living people
English women dramatists and playwrights
21st-century British dramatists and playwrights
21st-century English women writers
People from Camberwell
Writers from London